Black Like Kyra, White Like Me is the name of a 1992 children's picture book written and illustrated by Judith Vigna and published by Albert Whitman and Company. The story tells the tale of a friendship that develops between two young girls of separate ethnicities; Christy the narrator is Caucasian while her friend Kyra is of African descent. Conflict is created within the story when Kyra's family, the Kirks, move into Christy's neighborhood and racism threatens to tear their relationship and neighborhood apart. However, the story comes to a close when both Christy and Kyra's families develop a mutual trust and reliance on one another.

Written with a socially conscious agenda, Black Like Kyra, White Like Me endeavors to tackle racism and racist prejudices within a text suitable for young children. However, Vigna's writing has received criticism for using perceived stereotypes of black culture.

Plot 
When Christy's friend Kyra moves out of a violent neighborhood and relocates into Christy's own residential area, Christy's family and friends react negatively and are hesitant to meet Kyra's family, the Kirks. As the story progresses, tension further escalates when the Kirks are socially rejected at a neighborhood block party and vandalism occurs.  However, tension is relieved when Cristy's father apologizes to the Kirks for the racism they have endured, and Christy's mother offers to call the police after the Kirk's van has been vandalized. As the story comes to a close the relationship between Kyra's and Christy's families is improving, for Christy's mother drives both her daughter and Kyra to gymnastics and allows her daughter to see as much of Kyra as she wants. Moreover, Matt, Julie and their father move out of Christy and Kyra's neighborhood and thus reduce the racial tension.

Reception 
Black Like Kyra, White Like Me has received both positive and negative reviews ever since publication in 1992. Often included on lists of controversial children's literature, Black Like Kyra, White Like Me has received backlash for its perceived "racial insensitivity and insincerity ". Moreover, in 2000 Vigna was accused  of " reinforcing negative stereotypes about blacks and positive stereotypes about whites " by a customer of the Toronto Public Library, however  Black Like Kyra, White Like Me still remained on the library's shelves for public access. Nevertheless, Black Like Kyra, White Like Me, has received praise for being both a teaching tool about racism and a reflection of racial conflict and divide. In addition, in Pittman 's Whited Out: Unique Perspectives on Black Identity and Honors Achievement, Vigna's Black like Kyra, White Like Me is stated to be fundamental in producing and teaching empathy in early childhood development. Furthermore, Vigna's illustrations  have been praised for their attractiveness and ability to lighten up the story's heavy mood.

References

1992 children's books
American picture books
Children's books about friendship
Children's books about race and ethnicity
African-Americans in literature